Jorge Alberto Urbina Sánchez (born December 1, 1977 in Ciudad Victoria, Tamaulipas) is a Mexican football manager and former player.

External links

1977 births
Living people
Mexican footballers
Association football midfielders
Mexican football managers
La Piedad footballers
Correcaminos UAT footballers
Liga MX players
Ascenso MX players
Sportspeople from Tamaulipas
People from Ciudad Victoria